Calvin Elfring (born April 23, 1976) is a Canadian former professional ice hockey defenceman. He was originally selected by the Quebec Nordiques in the seventh round (165th overall) of the 1994 NHL Entry Draft. He played predominantly for Straubing Tigers in the 2nd Bundesliga and the Deutsche Eishockey Liga (DEL) from 2004 to 2013.

Career statistics

Awards and honours

References

External links

1976 births
Living people
Belfast Giants players
Canadian ice hockey defencemen
Cincinnati Mighty Ducks players
Hershey Bears players
Ice hockey people from Alberta
Lowell Lock Monsters players
Pee Dee Pride players
Quebec Nordiques draft picks
Roanoke Express players
SC Bietigheim-Bissingen players
Sportspeople from Lethbridge
Straubing Tigers players
Utah Grizzlies (IHL) players
Canadian expatriate ice hockey players in Germany
Canadian expatriate ice hockey players in the United States
AHCA Division I men's ice hockey All-Americans
Canadian expatriate ice hockey players in Northern Ireland